Events in the year 1938 in Mexico.

Incumbents

Federal government
 President: Lázaro Cárdenas
 Interior Secretary (SEGOB): Silvestre Guerrero; Ignacio García Téllez
 Secretary of Foreign Affairs (SRE): Eduardo Hay
 Communications Secretary (SCT): Francisco J. Múgica 
 Education Secretary (SEP): Gonzalo Vázquez Vela
 Secretary of Defense (SEDENA): Manuel Ávila Camacho

Supreme Court

 President of the Supreme Court: Daniel V. Valencia

Governors
 Aguascalientes: Enrique Osorio Camarena/Juan G. Alvarado Lavallade
 Campeche: Eduardo Mena Córdova
 Chiapas: Victórico R. Grajales/Efraín A. Gutiérrez
 Chihuahua: Rodrigo M. Quevedo
 Coahuila: Jesús Valdez Sánchez
 Colima: Miguel G. Santa Ana
 Durango: Enrique R. Calderón 
 Guanajuato: José Inocente Lugo
 Guerrero: José Inocente Lugo
 Hidalgo: Ernesto Viveros
 Jalisco: Everardo Topete
 State of Mexico: Eucario López
 Michoacán: Rafael Ordorica/Gildardo Magaña
 Morelos: José Refugio Bustamante
 Nayarit: Joaquín Cardoso
 Nuevo León: Gregorio Morales Sánchez/Anacleto Guerrero Guajardo
 Oaxaca: Anastasio García Toledo/Constantino Chapital
 Puebla: Gustavo Ariza
 Querétaro: Ramón Rodríguez Familiar
 San Luis Potosí: Mateo Fernández Netro
 Sinaloa: Manuel Páez
 Sonora: Ramón Ramos
 Tabasco: Víctor Fernández Manero
 Tamaulipas: Enrique Canseco
 Tlaxcala: Adolfo Bonilla	
 Veracruz: Miguel Alemán Valdés
 Yucatán: Fernando Cárdenas/Florencio Palomo Valencia
 Zacatecas: Matías Ramos

Events 
March 18 – Mexico nationalizes all foreign-owned oil properties within its borders.

Popular culture

Sports 
1938–39 Primera Fuerza season

Music

Film
Beautiful Mexico, musical directed by and starring Ramón Pereda, with Adriana Lamar and Antonio R. Frausto

Literature 
José Rubén Romero — La vida inútil de Pito Pérez

Births
12 February — Pilar Pellicer, actress (d. 2020)
4 May — Carlos Monsiváis, philosopher (d. 2010)
20 August 
Jacqueline Andere, actress
Irma González, wrestler

Deaths
19 October – Niño Fidencio, Roman Catholic priest and saint (b. 1898)

References

 
1930s in Mexico
Years of the 20th century in Mexico
Mexico